The Herbert Wertheim School of Public Health and Human Longevity Science (HWSPH) is the University of California, San Diego's school of public and community health. The school was founded in September 2019 following a 2018 gift from the Dr. Herbert and Nicole Wertheim Family Foundation. The school is currently led by founding Dean Cheryl A. M. Anderson, who was appointed to the position in June 2020.

The school currently offers programs leading to bachelors (B.Sc.), masters (MPH), doctoral (Ph.D.), and professional degrees. The school also offers a joint doctoral program in public health with San Diego State University.

References 

University of California, San Diego
Schools of public health in the United States
Medical and health organizations based in California
2019 establishments in California